Andrew Lynch is a retired Irish National Hunt jockey. Lynch had his first ride in a bumper at Fairyhouse in April 2001 and his first winning ride in May 2002 on Tristernagh in a novice hurdle at Downpatrick. Lynch won 2 races in the Cheltenham Festival in 2010 and 2011.  His 2 Cheltenham Festival wins in 2010 were on Sizing Europe and Berties Dream in the Arkle Challenge Trophy and Albert Bartlett Novices' Hurdle and  respectively while his 2011 wins were on Sizing Europe and Sizing Australia in the Queen Mother Champion Chase and Cross Country Chase respectively.  In May 2012 Lynch broke his leg after a fall at Cork.

TV
In 2013 he appeared on documentary The Irish Road To Cheltenham which was shown on RTÉ One television in Ireland.

Major wins

 Ireland
 Punchestown Gold Cup   -(1) Notre Pere  (2009)
 Punchestown Champion Chase   -(2) Sizing Europe (2012,2014)
 Ryanair Gold Cup   -(2) Jadanli (2010), Flemenstar (2012)
 Hatton's Grace Hurdle   -(1) Voler la Vedette (2011)
 John Durkan Memorial Punchestown Chase   -(2) Rubi Light (2011), Flemenstar (2012)
 Racing Post Novice Chase   -(1) Sizing Europe (2009)
 Paddy's Reward Club "Sugar Paddy" Chase   -(2) Sizing Europe (2012), Flemenstar (2015)
 Paddy Power Future Champions Novice Hurdle   -(2) De Valira (2006), Cash And Go (2011)
 Christmas Hurdle   -(1) Voler la Vedette (2011)
 Fort Leney Novice Chase   -(1)  Notre Pere (2007)
 Arkle Novice Chase   -(1)  Flemenstar (2012)
 Spring Juvenile Hurdle   -(1)  Hisaabaat (2012)
 Champion Four Year Old Hurdle   -(1)  Hisaabaat (2012)

 Great Britain
 Queen Mother Champion Chase   -(1) Sizing Europe (2011)
 Arkle Challenge Trophy   -(1) Sizing Europe (2010)
 Tingle Creek Chase   -(1) Sizing Europe (2011)
 Spa Novices' Hurdle   -(1) Berties Dream (2010)

References

External links
Go Racing Profile
Racing Post Stats
Irish Racing Stats

Irish jockeys
Living people
1988 births